Mohawk Hill is a hamlet in the town of West Turin in Lewis County, New York, United States. It is located on New York State Route 26, southwest of the village of Constableville.

References

Hamlets in New York (state)
Hamlets in Lewis County, New York